Elena Maureen Bertolino (29 September 1924 – 29 October 2002), known professionally as Marina Berti, was an Italian film actress. She was born in London from an Italian father and an English mother.

Biography
Her first screen appearance was in the Anna Magnani film, La Fuggitiva in 1941. She appeared mainly in small roles and in the occasional leading role in nearly 100 films both Italian and American. Her appearances include Quo Vadis (1951), Abdulla the Great (1955), Ben Hur (1959), Cleopatra (1963), If It's Tuesday, This Must Be Belgium (1969), What Have They Done to Your Daughters? (1974), Last Stop on the Night Train (1975), and the TV miniseries' Moses the Lawgiver (1975) and Jesus of Nazareth (1977). Her last film appearance was in the Costa-Gavras film Amen. in 2002.

She was married to the Italian actor Claudio Gora from 1944 until his death in 1998. She was the mother of actor Andrea Giordana and actress Marina Giordana.

Berti died in 2002 in a Rome hospital after a long illness.

Selected filmography

Cinema 

  (1941) - Lucia, l'assistente di Lia (uncredited)
  (1941)
 Giacomo the Idealist (1943) - Celestina
 The Valley of the Devil (1943) - Greta Hansel
  (1943) - Ester
  (1943) - Maria Anselmi
  (1944) - Zosi
 The Gates of Heaven (1945) - La crocerossina
 The Ten Commandments (1945) - (segment "Non desiderare la roba d'altri")
 The Testimony (1946) - Linda 
  (1946) - Caterina
 Fatal Symphony (1947)- Mirella
  (1947) - Anna
 Veglia nella notte (1948)
 The Earth Cries Out (1949) - Dina
 Prince of Foxes (1949) - Angela Borgia
 Sicilian Uprising (1949) - Laura
 The Sky Is Red (1950) - Carla
 Deported (1950) - Gina Carapia
 Hearts at Sea (1950) - (uncredited)
 Il sentiero dell'odio (1950)
 Up Front (1951) - Emi Rosso
 The Black Captain (1951) - Barbara Vivaldi
 Quo Vadis (1951) - Eunice, Petronius' Spanish slavegirl
 Operation Mitra (1951)
 The Queen of Sheba (1952) - Zamira, betrothed of Rehoboam
 Red Love (1952) -  Marianna Sirca
 La colpa di una madre (1952) - Alma
 Carne inquieta (1952) - Fema Ferrara
 Eager to Live (1953) - Lucia
 At the Edge of the City (1953) - Luisa
 Casta Diva (1954) - Beatrice Turina
 Knights of the Queen (1954) - Jacqueline Planchet
 Abdulla the Great (1955) - Aziza
  (1956)
 Marie Antoinette Queen of France (1956) - Comtesse de Polignac
 Il canto dell'emigrante (1956) - Mara
 The Knight of the Black Sword (1956) - Contessa Laura
 Le avventure di Roby e Buck (1957)
 Ben Hur (1959) - Flavia (uncredited)
 Un eroe del nostro tempo (1960)
 Madame Sans-Gêne (1962) - Elisa Bonaparte
 Jessica (1962) - Filippella Risino
 Damon and Pythias (1962) - Mereka - Nerissa's Friend
 Swordsman of Siena (1962) - Countess of Osta
 Cleopatra (1963) - Queen at Tarsus (uncredited)
 Face in the Rain (1963) - Anna
 Monsieur (1964) - Madame Danoni
 The Consequences (1964) - Elena
 Made in Italy (1965) - Bored Diner (segment "1 'Usi e costumi', episode 1")
 An Angel for Satan (1966) - Illa 
 The Stranger Returns (aka A Man, a Horse, a Gun) (1967) - Ethel
  (1967) - Ann
 Temptation (1969)
 If It's Tuesday, This Must Be Belgium (1969) - Gina
 Hate Is My God (1969) - Blanche Durand
 Dead End (1969) - Mother of Sergio
 Safety Catch (1970) - La soeur d'Alberta
 La califfa (1970) - Clementine Doberdò - la moglie di Annibale
 Tre nel mille (1971)
  (1972)
  (1973) - madame de Chambaudoin
 What Have They Done to Your Daughters? (1974) - Mrs. Polvesi
 The Divine Nymph (1974-1975) - Manoela's Aunt
 Night Train Murders (1975) - Laura Stradi - madre di una delle vittime
 Don Milani (1976) - La professoressa
  (1976)
 A Spiral of Mist (1977) - Constanza San Germano
 The Repenter (1985)
 L'ultima mazurka (1986) - Signora in treno
  (1988) - Luigina, Mario Bellomo's wife
  (1992) - Eva Meyer
 From the Other Side of the World (1992)
 Amen. (2002) - La Principessa (final film role)

Television 

 Le avventure dei tre moschettieri (1957 series) - Jacqueline Planchet
  (1960 miniseries)
 Moses the Lawgiver (1975 miniseries) - Eliseba
 Jesus of Nazareth (1977 miniseries) - Elizabeth

References

External links

 

British emigrants to Italy
Italian film actresses
1924 births
2002 deaths
Nastro d'Argento winners
Actresses from London
20th-century Italian actresses
20th-century English women
20th-century English people